The Salar Jung Museum is an art museum located at Dar-ul-Shifa, on the southern bank of the Musi River in the city of Hyderabad, Telangana, India. It is one of the notable National Museums of India. Originally a private art collection of the Salar Jung family, it was endowed to the nation after the death of Salar Jung III. It was inaugurated on 16 December 1951.

It has a collection of sculptures, paintings, carvings, textiles, manuscripts, ceramics, metallic artifacts, carpets, clocks, and furniture from Japan, China, Burma, Nepal, India, Persia, Egypt, Europe, and North America. It is one of the largest museums in the world.

History 
A nobleman of the Salar Jung family of Hyderabad, Nawab Mir Yousuf Ali Khan, Salar Jung III (1889–1949) served as prime minister of Hyderabad during the Nizam's rule. He spent a substantial amount of his income, over a period of thirty-five years, collecting artefacts from all across the world.

After the Nawab died in 1949, the collections were left behind in his ancestral palace Diwan Devdi. The collection was formerly exhibited there as a private museum, named Salar Jung Museum, which was inaugurated by Jawaharlal Nehru on 16 December 1951.

Old timers believe that the present collection constitutes only half of the original art wealth collected by the Nawab. His employees siphoned off part of it, since the Nawab depended upon his staff to keep a vigil.

In 1968, the museum shifted to its present location at Dar-ul-Shifa, and is administered by a board of trustees with the governor of Telangana as ex officio chairperson under the Salar Jung Museum Act of 1961. Some more art pieces were lost or stolen during the shifting of the museum from Dewan Devdi to the present site.

In 2003, the museum signed a memorandum of understanding with the National Mission for Manuscripts, and was declared a manuscript conservation centre.

In 2006, a fire broke out in an auditorium in the museum premises. However, it was quickly extinguished and none of the artifacts were damaged. After the incident, fire safety facilities were upgraded.

Collections

Indian 
The "Founder's Gallery" houses portraits of Salar Jung III, as well as other members of the Salar Jung family.

The Indian block includes jade-crafted daggers of Jahangir, Nur Jahan and Shah Jahan; and weapons belonging to Aurangzeb, Tipu Sultan, Muhammad Shah, Bahadur Shah and Abul Hasan Qutb Shah.

Indian miniature paintings belonging to the Mughal, Rajasthani, Thanjavur and Deccan schools are displayed. Indian sculptures from the Gandhara and Chola periods are also displayed.  The museum also has a collection of modern Indian artworks from the Bengal School. Works by Raja Ravi Varma, Abdur Rahman Chughtai, M.F. Hussain, K.K. Hebbar, Rabindranath Tagore, Abanidranath Tagore and Nandalal Bose are displayed.

Western 

In 1876 on a trip to France the a unique "double sculpture" Mephistopheles and Margaretta sculpture was acquired by Salar Jung I. He also traveled to Rome, where he purchased a marble statue called Veiled Rebecca.

The Salar Jung family had a history of collecting art, and eventually the collection of art from Salar Jung I, II and III all ended up in the Salar Jung Museum.

European art from the British, French and Italian schools is displayed. Among the notable artists whose works are displayed are Canaletto, William-Adolphe Bouguereau and Francesco Hayez.

The furniture collection includes pieces from the time of King Louis XIV and Napoleon. Salar Jung III collected about 43,000 artifacts and 50,000 books and manuscripts out of which only few are displayed in today's museum.

Eastern 
The Eastern block houses Japanese artworks, porcelain artifacts, samurai swords and sculptures from China, Japan, Tibet and Burma.

Quran collections 
The museum has a famous Quran collection, from around the world in different fonts and designs, called the Quran Written with Gold and Silver. There are many more collections of religious books, as well as Arabic Quran.

Clocks 
A variety and array of clocks are in the clock room. There are ancient sundials in the form of obelisks to huge and modern clocks of the twentieth century. Others in the range vary from miniature clocks which need a magnifying glass to view closely, to stately grandfather clocks from place such as France, Germany, Italy, Switzerland and Britain, including the musical clock Salar Jung bought from Cook and Kelvey of England.

The variety of clocks includes the bird cage clocks, bracket clocks, grandfather clocks, skeleton clocks, etc. The museum also has examples of the clocks of the contemporary period of Louis XV, Louis XVI, and Napoleon 1st of France.

The Indian Parliament has declared the museum an Institution of National Importance.

Coins
There is a collection of about 600 coins the from VijayNagar dynasty to Bahmani empire, Moghul empire and Modern India. Few coins are 2300yrs old. Some Punch Mark coins from Kushan dynasty are also preserved. The coins are made of Silver, copper,lead and lead.

Facilities 
The museum building, semicircular in shape with 38 galleries, spread on two floors, displays only a part of the original collection. The ground floor has 20 galleries and the first floor has 18 galleries. The exhibits on different subjects are displayed in separate galleries. Each gallery is huge and has many artifacts on display including ones dating back to the 4th century. There are plans for a new Islamic Gallery, where Islamic artifacts and manuscripts of the Qur'an will be displayed.

Apart from the galleries, there is a reference Library, reading room, publication and education section, chemical conservation lab, sales counter, cafeteria etc.

Gallery

See also

 List of museums in India
 List of largest art museums in the world
 Salar Jung III

References

External links

 History of its formation after Indian Independence
India Travel & Tour Information Portal (archived)

Art museums and galleries in India
Decorative arts museums in India
Hyderabad State
Museums in Hyderabad, India
Art museums established in 1951
1951 establishments in India
Salar Jung family
Tourist attractions in Hyderabad, India